Epiperipatus titanicus is a species of velvet worm in the family Peripatidae. This species is notable for the large size of its females (females range from 16 mm to 76 mm in length; males range from 29 mm to 41 mm in length) and for its numerous legs (females have 36 to 39 pairs of legs; males have 36 to 38 pairs). The type locality is in Alagoas state in Brazil.

References 

Onychophorans of tropical America
Onychophoran species
Animals described in 2018